Bochali is a village and a community in the southern part of the island of Zakynthos. It is part of the municipal unit of the city of Zakynthos. In 2011 its population was 876 for the village, and 1,143 for the community, including the villages Akrotiri and Kydoni. It is situated on a hill near the Ionian Sea coast, 1 km northwest of Zakynthos city centre and 1.5 km east of Gaitani.

Population

See also
List of settlements in Zakynthos

References

External links
Bochali at the GTP Travel Pages

Populated places in Zakynthos